Richard Smallwood (born 29 December 1990) is an English professional footballer who plays as a central midfielder for League Two club Bradford City.

Club career

Middlesbrough 
Smallwood's natural position is the holding role in the centre of midfield. He is a product of the Middlesbrough Academy and later became captain of the reserve team. At the start of the 2009–10 season, Smallwood signed his first professional contract with the club. Smallwood made his debut for Middlesbrough on 19 October 2010 in a 1–0 away defeat to Nottingham Forest. In January 2011, Smallwood signed an 18-month contract with the club. On 2 May 2011, Smallwood scored his first goal for the club in a 3–0 win against Cardiff City. On 3 November 2012, he scored his second league goal in a 4–1 win away to Charlton Athletic. However, in the 2013–14 season, Smallwood lost his first team place following new arrivals. Under the management of Aitor Karanka, Smallwood was among the players to be offloaded as part of Karanka's plans to reduce the squad size.

Rotherham United 
On 23 January 2014, Smallwood joined Rotherham United on loan for the remainder of the 2013–14 season. Shortly after arriving at Rotherham United, Smallwood quickly went straight into the first team; he was sent-off for a late challenge on Billy Knott, as Rotherham United beat Port Vale 1–0 on 21 April 2014. As a result of the challenge, Smallwood had to serve a three-match suspension, missing the last two games of the season and one match in the play-offs.

Smallwood scored the winning penalty in the shoot-out after taking the fifth penalty to win it as Rotherham secured promotion with a penalty shoot-out victory against Leyton Orient. After the match, Smallwood said it was the first time he had taken a penalty in his professional career. As a result of his good performance at Rotherham United, the club made a bid to sign Smallwood in early July, only to be rejected by Middlesbrough.

Initially signed in an emergency loan deal, Smallwood signed for Rotherham United on a permanent basis after Middlesbrough accepted a £175,000 bid for him.

Smallwood scored his first ever goal for Rotherham United in their 3–3 home draw with Derby County with a free-kick from the edge of the area.

On 31 August 2016, new Rotherham United manager Alan Stubbs sent Smallwood out on a season long loan to Scunthorpe United for the last year of his contract. With Stubbs no longer at the club, agreement was reached to terminate the loan on 9 January 2017. Smallwood scored one goal for Scunthorpe during his loan, the final goal in a 4–0 home defeat of Southend United on 10 September 2016. Smallwood elected to leave Rotherham United at the end of his contract, turning down an extension offered by the club.

Blackburn Rovers 
Smallwood signed a two-year contract with Blackburn Rovers on 20 June 2017. He scored his first goal for Blackburn in a 3–1 EFL Cup win against Coventry City on 8 August 2017.

Hull City
On 11 August 2020, Smallwood signed for Hull City, on a two-year deal with an option to extend a further year. Smallwood was then named as Hull City's captain for the upcoming 2020–21 season.
Smallwood played his first game for the club on 5 September 2020, in the first round of the EFL Cup away against Sunderland, which Hull won on penalties after a 0–0 draw. He scored his first goal for Hull in a 4–1 win at Preston North End on 7 August 2021.

Smallwood was released at the end of the 2021–22 season.

Bradford City 
On 22 June 2022, Smallwood signed for Bradford City on a free transfer on an initial two year deal. In July 2022 he was made captain.

International career 
He was a member of the England under-18 squad which defeated Austria 2–0 at Hartlepool United's Victoria Park on 16 April 2008.

Career statistics

Honours
Rotherham United
Football League One play-offs: 2014

Hull City
EFL League One: 2020–21

References

External links 
 
 

1990 births
Living people
People from Redcar
Footballers from North Yorkshire
English footballers
England youth international footballers
Association football midfielders
Middlesbrough F.C. players
Rotherham United F.C. players
Scunthorpe United F.C. players
Hull City A.F.C. players
 Bradford City A.F.C. players
English Football League players